Pseudopontia paradoxa is a species of butterfly found only in wet forests of tropical Africa. It was traditionally thought to be the only species (monotypic) in the genus Pseudopontia and the subfamily Pseudopontiinae. However, a recent study showed there are at least five species of Pseudopontia which can be distinguished genetically and by details of wing veins. Each is found primarily in a different part of Africa, though several of the species have overlapping geographic distributions.

It is considered paradoxical because, despite being a true butterfly (Papilionoidea), its antennae do not have the characteristic clubbed ends which are otherwise diagnostic of butterflies (Rhopalocera).

The larvae feed on Pseuderanthemum tunicatum, Rhopalopilia marquesii and Rhopalopilia pallens.

References

Seitz, A. Die Gross-Schmetterlinge der Erde 13: Die Afrikanischen Tagfalter. Plate XIII 10

Sources
Plötz, C. (1870) Pseudopontia Calabarica n. gen. et n. sp. Stettiner Entomologischer Zeitung, 31, 348–349, 1 pl.
Felder, R. (1869) [no title]. Petites Nouvelles Entomologiques, 1, 30–31.
Felder, R. (1870) Gonophlebia (Globiceps), Paradoxa (Felder). Petites Nouvelles Entomologiques, 1, 95.
Dixey, F.A. (1923) Pseudopontia paradoxa: its affinities, mimetic relations, and geographical races. Proceedings of the Entomological Society (London), lxi–lxvii +plate B.
Mitter, K.T., Larsen, T.B., et al. (2011). The butterfly subfamily Pseudopontiinae is not monobasic: marked genetic diversity and morphology reveal three new species of Pseudopontia (Lepidoptera: Pieridae). Systematic Entomology 36: 139–163. DOI: 10.1111/j.1365-3113.2010.00549.x

External links
Pseudopontiinae, TOL
Pseudopontia, funet
, BOLD

Pieridae
Butterflies described in 1869
Butterflies of Africa
Taxa named by Rudolf Felder